Sthembiso Nkanyiso Sboniso Ntombela or Sthembiso Ntombela (born 21 March 1982) is a South African footballer (defender) playing currently for PSAP Sigli.

External links
Profile at liga-indonesia.co.id

1982 births
Association football midfielders
Association football defenders
Expatriate footballers in Indonesia
Liga 1 (Indonesia) players
Hong Kong First Division League players
Living people
South African expatriate soccer players
South African soccer players
PSAP Sigli players
Hong Kong Rangers FC players